Jyothika is an Indian actress who predominantly appears in Tamil films. She also acted in some Telugu, Malayalam, Kannada and Hindi films. She debuted in Bollywood in the Hindi film Doli Saja Ke Rakhna (1997), directed by Priyadarshan. She starred in her first Tamil film Vaali (1999) and her first Telugu film Tagore (2003), opposite Chiranjeevi. She received her first Filmfare Awards for Vaali (1999) as Filmfare Award for Best Female Debut – South. She was awarded the Filmfare Best Tamil Actress Award for Kushi (2000) A string of successful films followed and gained prominence for her performances in Kushi (2000),  Perazhagan (2004), Chandramukhi (2005) and Mozhi, (2007). Jyothika left the industry at the peak of her career marrying Tamil actor Suriya on 11 September 2006, after being engaged in a relationship for several years, and with whom she was paired in seven films.

Jyothika made a comeback in the film 36 Vayadhinile (2015) where her performance was given strong reviews and she received Filmfare Critics Award for Best Actress – South. In Pachaikili Muthucharam (2007) she had a crucial role and pulled off a memorable performance. In 2018, she appeared as the lead role of Chitra, a housewife to Arvind Swamy's character in Mani Ratnam's film Chekka Chivantha Vaanam. The first look was released on 21 August. The film has a worldwide release on 27 September 2018. She was next seen as a housewife struggling to find her own identity in Kaatrin Mozhi, the Tamil remake of Vidya Balan's Tumhari Sulu. The project was directed by Radha Mohan and marked his reunion with Jyothika after the critically acclaimed Mozhi. After the success of Kaatrin Mozhi, Jyothika signed three films, Raatchasi, produced by Dream Warrior Pictures in which she plays a school teacher; Jackpot, in which she appears as a cop co-starring Revathi under 2D Entertainment and Thambi, a Jeethu Joseph film along with Karthi.

Filmography

Short films

See also 
 List of awards and nominations received by Jyothika
 2D Entertainment

Footnotes

References

External links
 

Actress filmographies
Indian filmographies